Eski Kermen or Eski-Kermen was a cave town and fortress in the Crimea in the south of the Ukraine. Founded by the Byzantine Empire in the 6th century to defend against the Göktürks, it was conquered by the Khazars in the 7th or 8th century.

The fortress was built on a plateau of about 1km by 200m. Remains have been found of a basilica. The occupants were probably Alans or Goths. The military impartance of the place disappeared after the Khazars had conquered it, but it remained a thriving cave dwelling until at least the 11th century, during the rule of the Pechenegs. It seems to have been deserted in the 14th century, under the rule of the Tatars. Nowadays, most surface structures have disappeared and only some 400 cave rooms remain.

Notes

Crimean Karaites
Forts in Ukraine
Former populated places in Crimea
Ghost towns in Ukraine
Cultural heritage monuments of federal significance in Crimea